The Trouble With You is a 2018 French film directed by Pierre Salvadori. It was selected to screen in the Directors' Fortnight section at the 2018 Cannes Film Festival.

Cast
 Adèle Haenel : Yvonne Santi
 Pio Marmaï : Antoine Parent
 Damien Bonnard : Louis
 Vincent Elbaz : Jean Santi
 Audrey Tautou : Agnès Parent
 Hocine Choutri : Mariton
 Octave Bossuet : Théo Santi
 Steve Tran : A client

Plot 
Yvonne tells her young son every night the adventures of his father Jean, a police officer who died two years before. She is a lieutenant herself, and she prefers being on the field to the desk job she has. During a routine interrogation, she learns that Jean was in fact a corrupt cop, and had got Antoine imprisoned, who had a clean history before, for a hold-up of a jewellery shop. Louis, a colleague who is in love with her, convinces Yvonne to not reveal anything and let Antoine finish his last weeks in jail.

Antoine gets released soon. Yvonne, who is regretful, follows him and observes that after years of imprisonment, he is now mentally disturbed. Antoine finds his wife Agnès, who has been waiting for him. He has strange and sometimes violent reactions - he commits petty theft and beats up several people who attack him at a pub. Yvonne lets him get away at each instance.

After a fight with his wife, he is wandering around on the road, when he decides to jump in the sea. Yvonne who has been following him, jumps to save him. They get back to the city in a stolen car. Yvonne is both stunned and attracted to him, comes home to her son, who is being babysat by Louis. She then flirts with him, to his great surprise.

The next day, Antoine is taken to the police station for having crashed the car. Yvonne, who doesn't want Antoine to know that she works with the police, sits on a bench with prostitutes, to make it look like she is one of them.

Antoine, thinking that Yvonne is a prostitute, invites her to dinner, but Louis takes Yvonne on a fake suspect chase. Disappointed, Antoine takes the restaurant personnel hostage and burns down the restaurant. Yvonne removes him from the scene and hides him in a disused underground sado-masochist club. Antoine escapes, leaves his wife and handcuffs Yvonne to a bedpost to go rob the jewellery shop that he was supposed to have robbed, thus making him truly guilty and giving a meaning to the imprisonment which destroyed his youth.

Yvonne escapes and meets Antoine in the jewellery shop. She helps him to take the jewels and convinces him to escape to join his wife, while Yvonne gets arrested.

Much later, Yvonne is released from prison and finds Louis, who has taken care of her son during this time.

References

External links
 

2018 films
2010s French-language films
Films directed by Pierre Salvadori
French drama films
2018 drama films
2010s French films